Michel Rosenfeld (born 5 July 1948) is University Professor of Law and Comparative Democracy, the Justice Sydney L. Robins Professor of Human Rights and Director, Program on Global and Comparative Constitutional Theory at the Benjamin N. Cardozo School of Law of Yeshiva University.

Rosenfeld has been at Cardozo since 1988 and teaches courses in Comparative Constitutionalism, Constitutional Law I, Constitutional Law II, Constitutional Interpretation, Constitutionalism and Democracy in an Age of Globalization and Privatization, Liberalism and its Critics and Concepts of Justice. He obtained his Juris Doctor degree from Northwestern University in 1974, and received his B.A. (1969), M.A. (1971), M.Phil. (1978) and Ph.D. in Philosophy (1991) from Columbia University.

He is the author of several books, including Affirmative Action and Justice: A Philosophical and Constitutional Inquiry, Just Interpretations: Law Between Ethics and Politics,  The Identity of the Constitutional Subject: Selfhood, Citizenship, Culture and Community and "Law, Justice, Democracy and the Clash of Cultures: A Pluralist Account", a co-author of Comparative Constitutionalism: Cases and Materials, and a co-editor of Deconstruction and the Possibility of Justice", "Habermas on Law and Democracy: Critical Exchanges", "The Oxford Handbook of Comparative Constitutional Law" and "Constitutional Secularism in an Age of Religious Revival". He has been the President of the International Association of Constitutional Law (1999-2004) and  Editor-in-Chief of the International Journal of Constitutional Law (2001-2014). He was awarded the French Legion of Honor in 2004, named to a 2007-2008 Blaise Pascal Excellence Research Chair, the Fresco Chair in Jurisprudence at the University of Genoa, Italy (2007), The Chaim Perelman Chair in Legal Philosophy at the Free University in Brussels, Belgium (2011), the Fulbright-Tocqueville Distinguished Chair at the University of Paris I (Pantheon-Sorbonne) (2013), and the Leverhulme Visiting Professorship at the Birkbeck School of Law of the University of London (2014).

External links
 : Cardozo Faculty: Michel Rosenfeld

American legal scholars
Columbia University alumni
Cardozo School of Law faculty
Northwestern University Pritzker School of Law alumni
Living people
Fulbright Distinguished Chairs
Year of birth missing (living people)